Aditya Shankar (born January 8, 1985) is an Indian-American film producer, screenwriter, film director, television program creator, television showrunner, and occasional actor. He is best known for Dredd, Castlevania, and his "Bootleg Universe" One-Shot series of unauthorized pop culture satire films which include The Punisher: Dirty Laundry, Venom: Truth in Journalism, and Power/Rangers. He is also known for being the youngest producer to have a number one film at the North American box office with The Grey.

In 2014, Shankar ranked number 20 on GQ magazine's list of "Most Influential Global Indian Men". He co-founded the production company 1984 Private Defense Contractors. In 2015, upon signing a three-picture deal with Disney's Maker Studios, Shankar was proclaimed the "Quentin Tarantino of the digital generation" by Maker executives.

Early life 
Aditya Shankar was born in Kolkata, West Bengal, India, to a banking executive and an educator. His family spent his formative years relocating among Chennai, Mumbai, Hong Kong, Rhode Island, and Singapore. Shankar studied communications, business, and theater at Northwestern University and graduated in June 2007.

Influences 
For his controversial "Bootleg Universe" Shankar cites British street artist Banksy as a major influence. In addition, Shankar frequently cites rapper Eminem, writer Warren Ellis, artist Takashi Murakami, wrestler Diamond Dallas Page, and Final Fantasy VII character Sephiroth as artistic and stylistic influences.

The Simpsons – "The Apu problem" 
In April 2018, Shankar started a script contest which he hoped would encourage people to rewrite The Simpsons character Apu Nahasapeemapetilon "that takes the character of Apu and in a clever way subverts him, pivots him, intelligently writes him out, or evolves him". He stated that, in the event that the show's producers will not take on the winning script, he would produce and distribute the episode as part of his, "Bootleg Universe" fan films.

On October 26, 2018, Shankar leaked during an interview with IndieWire that Apu was going to be written out of the show, stating that he got the information from two people who work for The Simpsons and a third source who works directly with creator Matt Groening. A representative for the show at Fox responded, saying, "Apu appeared in the 10/14/18 episode My Way or the Highway to Heaven." In the episode, Apu makes an appearance as one of dozens of characters gathered around God in Heaven. On October 28, Simpsons executive producer and show runner Al Jean responded on Twitter by saying "Adi Shankar is not a producer on the Simpsons. I wish him the best but he does not speak for our show."

Filmography

Film

Television

"Bootleg Universe" One-Shot Films

References

External links 
 
 The Bootleg Universe on YouTube

Living people
1985 births
American people of Indian descent
American people of Bengali descent
American businesspeople
Northwestern University alumni
American male film actors
Indian emigrants to the United States
People from Kolkata
Male actors from Kolkata